Skjerjavatnet is a lake on the border of the municipalities of Vaksdal and Modalen in Vestland county, Norway. The southwest and northeast ends of the lake are both dammed up so that the lake can be regulated for hydroelectric power.

See also
List of lakes in Norway

References

Modalen
Vaksdal
Lakes of Vestland
Reservoirs in Norway